The Spania GTA Spano is a limited-production sports car produced by Spanish automobile manufacturer Spania GTA, a sister company to GTA Motor Competición. Only 99 units of the GTA Spano are expected to be built.

Development 
After 15 years of racing experience in various leagues with Spania GTA Competición, team director Domingo Ochoa wanted to pursue his goal of bringing a Spanish sports car into production. On April 29th, 2009, After five years in development, the GTA Spano was first presented to a select group at L'Hemisfèric in the City of Arts and Sciences, Valencia.

The GTA Spano was first displayed to the public at the 2010 Top Marques Monaco exhibition. It was displayed with the same specifications as the previous year's prototype.

The Spano GTA made its first Geneva Motor Show appearance the following year, in March 2011. This version of the car also used the 8.3 L V10, with three transmission options: a 7-speed automated manual, a 7-speed automated manual, with paddle-shifters, and a 7-speed manual.

First generation (2013–2015) 

The production version of the GTA Spano was unveiled at the 2013 Geneva Motor Show, four years after the initial presentation of the prototype in Valencia. Only two of the original three transmission options were available for the production version of the GTA Spano; the 7-speed automated manual and the 7-speed manual.

Second generation (2015–present) 
At the 2015 Geneva Motor Show, Spania GTA introduced an overhauled version of the GTA Spano. Several internal and external changes were made to differentiate this from the first generation model, including completely revised styling. The only transmission now offered is a new 7-speed paddle-shift automated manual, produced by CIMA.

In the development of the second generation of the GTA Spano, Spania GTA partnered with Spanish nanotechnology firm Graphenano to incorporate graphene materials into the car's chassis. The manufacturer claims that the use of graphene in the bodywork increases the car's structural rigidity and decreases weight. The second generation car also features more extensive use of carbon fiber body panels.

Specifications

Chassis 
The GTA Spano utilises a monocoque chassis design, manufactured from carbon fibre and reinforced with titanium and Kevlar composites. The second generation model also introduces graphene elements into this design, for the purpose of added chassis stiffness and rigidity.

Suspension 
Both first and second generation models of the GTA Spano come equipped with double wishbone suspension at the front and rear axles. The suspension system features adaptive shock absorbers and a front axle lifting mechanism.

Wheels 
The first generation of the GTA Spano came equipped with forged alloy wheels with diameters of 19 inches at the front and 20 inches at the rear. The wheels are shod with Pirelli P Zero tyres with codes of 255/35 ZR 19 for the front and 335/30 ZR 20 for the rear.

For the second generation model, Spania GTA switched to Michelin tyres and increased the sizes all around. The new car comes with Michelin Pilot Super Sport tyres with codes of 265/30 ZR 19 for the front and 345/30 ZR 20 for the rear.

The brakes for all models are  diameter, 6 caliper carbon ceramic ventilated discs.

Exterior features 
The GTA Spano features a specially designed panoramic moonroof whose opacity can be controlled from inside the cabin. The driver can also control the car's active rear wing to adjust the level of downforce produced at speed.

Powertrains and performance

In popular culture 
The GTA Spano was featured in the 2014 film Need For Speed.

The GTA Spano has been featured in a number of video games, including Need for Speed Rivals, Forza Horizon 3, Forza Motorsport 7, Forza Horizon 4, Driveclub, Asphalt 8: Airborne, Asphalt 9: Legends, CSR Racing, and CSR Racing 2.

The GTA was also featured in the TV series "Ballers" season 2, episode 7.

References

External links 

Cars introduced in 2010
Rear mid-engine, rear-wheel-drive vehicles
Cars of Spain
Sports cars
Coupés